Paeonia peregrina is a species of flowering plant in the peony family Paeoniaceae, native to Southeastern Europe and Turkey. It is an erect, herbaceous perennial with 9-lobed, deeply divided leaves. Single, glossy red flowers,  in diameter, with prominent yellow stamens, are borne in spring (May in the Northern Hemisphere).

The cultivar 'Otto Froebel' has gained the Royal Horticultural Society's Award of Garden Merit.

References

peregrina
Flora of Western Asia
Flora of Europe
Taxa named by Philip Miller
National symbols of Kosovo